Ted Petersen (born February 7, 1955) is a former professional American football offensive lineman. He played for nine seasons in the National Football League (NFL) for the Pittsburgh Steelers, the Cleveland Browns, and the Indianapolis Colts. Petersen is the former athletic director at Kankakee Community College in Kankakee, Illinois.

References

1955 births
Living people
Sportspeople from Kankakee, Illinois
American football offensive linemen
Eastern Illinois Panthers football players
Pittsburgh Steelers players
Cleveland Browns players
Indianapolis Colts players
Players of American football from Illinois